Victor Cristaldo (born 10 May 1967) is an Argentine-born Australian former professional footballer of Paraguayan descent who played as a midfielder and currently works as a coach.

In 1985 and 1986, Cristaldo played for Melbourne Knights in the National Soccer League.

Cristaldo then passed 5 seasons in the Primera División Paraguaya from 1993 to 1997. In this task, he featured for Club Presidente Hayes and Club Sport Colombia, becoming the first Australian to play in Paraguay and the second player to play in South America after John Crawley (1990 in Chile).

Following his retirement, Cristaldo became a coach.

He is the father of Australian footballer Christopher Cristaldo.

Early life
Cristaldo was born in Argentina to Paraguayan parents and moved to Australia at the age of 9. He attended Flemington High School.

Career

Leicester City
In 1984, Cristaldo played fot Leicester City for three months, scoring 12 goals in 15 games for the club's reserve and youth teams.

Melbourne Knights
Cristaldo started his career with Melbourne club Keilor Park and later joined Melbourne Knights in Australia's National Soccer League in 1985, being a member of the squad for the 1985 and 1986 seasons. In 1986, whilst playing for Melbourne Knights, he was called up to the Argentine Air Force.

Thomastown
In 1988, Cristaldo played for Thomastown, where he remained until 1992.

Presidente Hayes
In 1993, Cristaldo joined Primera División Paraguaya club Presidente Hayes in the city of Asunción. Cristaldo told Australian newspaper The Age "It's like a dream come true. But financially, it's just not possible". Cristaldo's wages in Paraguay were more than three times higher than they were in Australia and the cost of living in Paraguay was much lower. He and his wife, Cynthia, bought a house and the club supplied them with a car. At Presidente Hayes, Cristaldo was teammates with national team players Edgar Denis and Justo Jacquet. Cristaldo hoped that during the Paraguayan off-season that an Australian National Soccer League club would, at the very least, give him a guest stint.

Western Suburbs
Cristaldo played for Western Suburbs in the Victorian State League Division 1 in 1996, scoring two goals.

Sport Colombia
In 1996, Cristaldo passed to Club Sport Colombia for the 1996 Primera División season, as Sport Colombia finished fourth in the Torneo Clausura. He remained there until 1997, which was when future national team player Nelson Cuevas debuted for the club.

Western Suburbs
He returned to Western Suburbs in 1998.

International career
Cristaldo represented the Australia U-20 national team. In 1993, Cristaldo hoped that his success in Paraguay would prompt Australia's national team coach, Eddie Thomson, to consider adding him to the squad.

Management career
Cristaldo moved into coaching after retiring as a player. He has had roles at a number of clubs including Monash City and Sunshine George Cross.

Personal life
Cristaldo is the father of Paraguayan-born Australian footballer Christopher who appeared for the Australia U-20 national team, Melbourne Victory in the A-League and Nacional Asunción in the Primera División Paraguaya.

See also
 List of expatriate footballers in Paraguay
 Players and Records in Paraguayan Football

References

1967 births
Living people
Association football midfielders
Australian soccer players
Melbourne Knights FC players
Sport Colombia footballers
Club Presidente Hayes footballers
National Soccer League (Australia) players
Australian expatriate soccer players
Australian soccer coaches
Expatriate footballers in Paraguay
Australian people of Paraguayan descent